Jimi Tenor (born Lassi O. T. Lehto, 1965) is a Finnish musician. His artist name is a combination of the first name of his youth idol Jimmy Osmond and the tenor saxophone. His band Jimi Tenor & His Shamans released its first album in 1988, whilst Tenor's first solo album appeared in 1994. "Take Me Baby" became his first hit in 1994. He has released albums on Sähkö Recordings, Warp Records and Kitty-Yo record labels.

Tenor has performed several times with the avant-garde big band Flat Earth Society.

In 1997, he contributed a cover of "Down in the Park" to on the Gary Numan tribute album 'Random. In 2009, he covered an Elektroids song for the Warp20 (Recreated) compilation album, as well as having his song "Paint the Stars" covered by Hudson Mohawke.

Tenor was born in Lahti, Finland.

Discography

Jimi Tenor and his Shamans
 Total Capacity of 216,5 Litres; LP (1988, Euros)
 Diktafon;  CD/LP (1989, Poko Records)
 Mekanoid;  CD/LP (1990, Poko Records)
 Fear of a Black Jesus;  CD/LP (1992, Bad Vugum)

Solo
Sähkömies; Digital/CD/LP (1994, Sähkö Recordings)
 Europa; Digital/CD/LP (1995, Sähkö Recordings)
 Intervision; Digital/CD/LP (1997, Warp)
Venera; EP/CD, (1998, Warp)
Organism; Digital/CD/LP (1999 Warp/Sire Records)
Out Of Nowhere; Digital/CD/LP (2000, Warp)
Cosmic Relief; Digital/EP, (2001, Sähkö Recordings)
Utopian Dream; Digital/CD/LP (2001, Sähkö Recordings)
Higher Planes; Digital/CD/LP (2003, Kitty-Yo)
Beyond The Stars; Digital/CD/LP (2004, Kitty-Yo)
ReComposed by Jimi Tenor; Digital/CD/LP (2006, Deutsche Grammophon)
Live in Berlin; Digital (2007, Kitty-Yo)
Saxentric; Digital/CD/LP (2016, Herakles Records)
Order of Nothingness; Digital/CD/LP (2018, Philophon)
Metamorpha; Digital (2020, BubbleTease Communications)

With Abdissa Assefa
Itetune; LP (2011, Temmikongi)

With Kabu Kabu
Sunrise; EP/CD (2006, Sähkö Recordings)
Joystone; Digital/CD/LP (2007, Sähkö Recordings)
Mystery Spot; 7" (2008, Sahco Records)
4th Dimension; Digital/CD/LP (2009, Sähkö Recordings)
Mystery of Aether; Digital/CD/LP (2012, Kindred Spirits)

With Tony Allen
Inspiration Information Volume 4; Digital/CD/LP (2009, Strut Records)
OTO Live Party; Digital/CD/LP (2018, Moog Recordings Library)

With Lary 7, Mia Teodoratus; Soft Focus
Soft Focus; Digital/LP (2013, Sähkö Recordings)

With Nicole Willis; Cola & Jimmu
Soul Makeover; as Nicole Willis, Digital/CD/LP (2000, Sähkö Recordings/Puu)
Be It; as Nicole Willis,  Digital/CD/LP (2004, Sähkö Recordings/Puu)
Enigmatic; as Cola & Jimmu, Digital/CD/LP (2013, Herakles Records)
I Give To You My Love And Devotion; as Cola & Jimmu, Digital/CD/LP (2014, Herakles Records)
My Name Is Nicole Willis; as Nicole Willis & UMO Jazz Orchestra, Digital/CD/LP (2017, Persephone Records)

With Nicole Willis & The Soul Investigators (As also Jimmy Tenor)
You Better Change/Raw Steaks; 7" (2003, Sahco Records)
If This Ain't Love (Don't Know What Is)/Instrumental; 7"/Maxi/WL/CD (2005/2007, Timmion Records/Above The Clouds/Differ-Ant)
Keep Reachin' Up; Digital/CD/LP/Cass (2005/2006/2007/2008, Timmion Records/Mit-Wit Records/P-Vine Records/Light In The Attic/Above The Clouds/Differ-Ant)
My Four Leaf Clover/Holdin' On; 7" (2006, Timmion Records)
Feeling Free/Instrumental; 7" (2006/2007, Timmion Records/Above The Clouds)
Tell Me When/It's All Because Of You; 7" (2013, Timmion Records)
Tortured Soul; Digital/CD/LP (2013, Timmion Records/P-Vine Records)
Paint Me In A Corner/Where Are You Now; 7" (2015, Timmion Records)
Happiness In Every Style; Digital/CD/LP (2015, Timmion Records)
One In A Million/Instrumental; Digital/7" (2015, Timmion Records)
Let's Communicate/Instrumental; 7" (2015, Timmion Records)

With Nicole Willis featuring Tony Allen
All For You/Touching; 7" (2015, Sahco Records)

With Myron & E with The Soul Investigators
Broadway; Digital/CD/LP (2013, Timmion Records)

With Willie West & The High Society Brothers
Lost Soul; Digital/CD/LP (2014, Timmion Records)

With The Soul Investigators
Vulture's Prayer/Bad Viberations; 7" (2015, Timmion Records)
Soul Groove; Digital/CD/LP (2015, Timmion Records)

With UMO Jazz Orchestra
Mysterium Magnum; Digital/CD/LP (2015, Herakles Records)
My Name Is Nicole Willis; Digital/CD/LP (2017, Persephone Records)

With Tapani Rinne 

 Suburban Sax; Digital/CD (1991, no label)

References

External links
  – official site
 
 Jimi Tenor & His Shamans fanpage (archive)

1965 births
Living people
Kitty-Yo artists
Finnish male musicians
People from Lahti
Ubiquity Records artists